That Man from Rio is a 1964 French-Italian international co-production adventure film directed by Philippe de Broca and starring Jean-Paul Belmondo and Françoise Dorléac. It was the first film to be made by the French subsidiary of United Artists, Les Productions Artistes Associés. The film was a huge success with a total of 4,800,626 admissions in France, becoming the 5th highest earning film of the year.

This fast-moving spoof of James Bond-type films features striking location photography by Edmond Séchan of Rio de Janeiro, Brasília, and Paris. At the 37th Academy Awards, the film was nominated for the Academy Award for Best Original Screenplay.

The story was inspired by the series of comic albums The Adventures of Tintin, and That Man from Rio was one of the main inspirations for Raiders of the Lost Ark (1981). Steven Spielberg reportedly told de Broca he'd seen it nine times.

Plot
As airman Adrien Dufourquet embarks on an 8-day leave in Paris to see his fiancée Agnès, two South American Indians steal an Amazonian statuette from the Musée de l'Homme and force Professor Catalan, the curator, into their car. Catalan was the companion of Agnès' father on an expedition into the Amazonian rainforest during which her father died. Catalan believes that the statuette is one of three which hold the secret to an Amazonian treasure. Adrien arrives in time to see the Indians abducting Agnès, the only one who knows the location of her father's statuette, and he pursues them to the airport where he steals a ticket and boards the same plane.

Adrien tells the pilot that his fiancée has been abducted, but Agnès has been drugged and does not recognize him. The pilot plans to have Adrien arrested when they reach Rio de Janeiro, but Adrien eludes the police upon arrival. With the help of Sir Winston, a Brazilian bootblack, Adrien rescues Agnès. They retrieve the buried statuette, but the Indians steal it from them.

In a stolen car provided by Sir Winston, Agnès and Adrien drive to Brasilia to meet Senhor de Castro, a wealthy industrialist who possesses the third statuette. On the way, they come across the Indians' car with Catalan slumped inside; after picking him up, they drive on to Brasilia.

At a party in their honor, De Castro takes Catalan to his strong room to assure him of the statuette's safety, and Catalan, who planned the museum theft, murders him and steals the statuette. By the time Adrien discovers the body, Catalan and the Indians have abducted Agnès again and escaped in a seaplane. Adrien steals a plane and follows.

In a floating jungle cafe run by Lola, the woman who financed Catalan, Adrien learns that Catalan murdered Agnès' father and that Agnès is being held in a boat. Rushing to the boat, Adrien hangs onto the side as it heads upstream and finally docks. While Catalan goes to the underground location of the treasure, Adrien knocks out all of Catalan's accomplices and rescues Agnès. Catalan finds the treasure, but an explosion set off by a nearby Trans-Amazonian Highway construction crew causes him to be buried with it. Adrien and Agnès flee the jungle and arrive in Paris in time for Adrien to catch his train back to his garrison.

Cast
 Jean-Paul Belmondo as Pvt. Adrien Dufourquet
 Françoise Dorléac as Agnès Villermosa
 Jean Servais as the Prof. Norbert Catalan
 Adolfo Celi as Mario de Castro
 Simone Renant as Lola
 Roger Dumas as Lebel, Dufourquet's buddy
 Daniel Ceccaldi as Police inspector
 Milton Ribeiro as Tupac
 Ubiracy de Oliveira as Sir Winston the shoeshine
 Sabu do Brasil
 Peter Fernandez

Production
The film was a follow up to Cartouche, a popular swashbuckler with Belmondo. It was decided that he should star in a James Bond spoof. Italian financing of the film led to the Italian actor Adolfo Celi, then resident in Brazil, being cast as Mario de Castro.

Jean-Paul Belmondo's personal tastes were Tintin comics, sports magazines, and detective novels. He said he preferred "making adventure films like Rio to the intellectual movies of Alain Resnais or Alain Robbe-Grillet."

Release
That Man from Rio was released in France on 28 February 1964.

Reception

Awards
The film was nominated for Best Original Screenplay at the Academy Awards.

Critical
In contemporary reviews, the Monthly Film Bulletin reviewed and English-dubbed version noted that the "One may feel that [de Broca]'s inconsequential wit is better suited to the smaller, more parochial atmosphere of his earlier films, but here he is involved in a big budget production aimed at a huge audience, and perhaps we ought to be grateful that so much of his personal style has survived, even in the carefully dubbed and slightly shortened American version now presented." The review noted that the film was "beautifully organised" and that "it always keeps the chuckles rising even if they seldom break into real guffaws." and praised the two leads, specifically Belmondo who "outdid Douglas Fairbanks in agility, Harold Lloyd in cliffhanging, and James Bond in indestructibility".

Stanley Kauffmann of The New Republic called That Man from Rio "a delightful film".

In a retrospective review, The Dissolve gave the film a rating of three and a half stars out of five, noting that "the action moves along at such a rapid clip, there’s little time to worry about how much the plot relies on incredible coincidences".

Time Out selected the movie as #99 for its list of the 100 greatest French films.

References

External links

That Man from Rio at Le Film Guide

That Man from Rio at TCMDB
Review of film at New York Times

French-language Italian films
1964 films
1960s adventure comedy films
1960s parody films
Films scored by Georges Delerue
Films about kidnapping
Films directed by Philippe de Broca
Films set in Brazil
Films set in Paris
Films set in Rio de Janeiro (city)
Films shot in Rio de Janeiro (city)
French adventure comedy films
1960s French-language films
Italian adventure comedy films
Films with screenplays by Jean-Paul Rappeneau
Treasure hunt films
United Artists films
1960s chase films
Films shot in Brasília
1964 comedy films
Parody films based on James Bond films
1960s Italian films
1960s French films